Conura side is a species of chalcidid wasp in the family Chalcididae.

References

Parasitic wasps
Articles created by Qbugbot
Insects described in 1843
Chalcidoidea